Leiolopisma telfairii, also known commonly as the Round Island ground skink, the Round Island skink, and Telfair's skink, is a species of lizard in the family Scincidae. The species is endemic to Round Island, one of the islands of Mauritius.

Taxonomy
Other members of the genus Leiolopisma occur on New Caledonia and New Zealand, but the Round Island skink is closely related to the two extinct Mascarenes taxa, L. mauritiana from Mauritius and L. ceciliae from Réunion.

Etymology
L. telfairii is named after Irish botanist Charles Telfair, the founder of the Royal Society of Arts and Sciences of Mauritius.

Description
 
The body is general brownish grey mottled with dark brown spots. The small scales exhibit an iridescence when the sunlight is reflected on them. The body is approximately cylindrical. L. telfairii can cast its relatively long tail during a fight or to escape capture; the tail is regenerated after a while. The short but vigorous legs are used to dig burrows.

Ecology
The omnivorous diet of L. telfairii consists of seeds, fruits, insects, and small lizards. Cannibalism is not unknown, and L. telfairii may even kill its own young to eat them.

Status and conservation
L. telfairii was once numerous on Mauritius and offshore islands like Flat Island. Due to habitat destruction and introduced species like goats, black rats, and rabbits, it has been limited to Round Island since the middle of the 19th century. When Gerald Durrell visited Round Island in the 1970s he recorded 5,000 specimens. He brought some specimens to the Jersey Zoo to build up a captive breeding program. Since the eradication of the goats and rabbits on Round Island the skink population has increased to the point that some could be relocated to other islands, like Gunner's Quoin (Coin du Mire) and the Île aux Aigrettes.

References

Further reading
 (2006). "Using ancient and recent DNA to explore relationships of extinct and endangered Leiolopisma skinks (Reptilia: Scincidae) in the Mascarene islands". Molecular Phylogenetics and Evolution 39 (2): 503–511. (HTML abstract)
 (1887). Catalogue of the Lizards in the British Museum (Natural History). Second Edition. Volume III. ... Scincidæ ... London: Trustees of the British Museum (Natural History). (Taylor and Francis, printers). xii + 575 pp. + Plates I-XL. (Lygosoma telfairii, new combination, pp. 270–271).
 (1831). "Sur trois espèces de lézard du genre scinque, qui habitent l'île Maurice (Ile-de-France)". Annales des Sciences Naturelles, Paris 22: 292-299. (Scincus telfairii, new species, pp. 293–296). (in French and Latin).

External links
ARKive - images and movies of the Round Island skink (Leiolopisma telfairii)

Leiolopisma
Reptiles described in 1831
Reptiles of Mauritius
Endemic fauna of Mauritius
Taxa named by Julien Desjardins